HMS L15 was a L-class submarine built for the Royal Navy during World War I. The boat survived the war and was sold for scrap in 1932.

Design and description
L9 and its successors were enlarged to accommodate 21-inch (53.3 cm) torpedoes and more fuel. They displaced  on the surface and  submerged. The L-class submarines had a crew of 38 officers and ratings.

For surface running, the boats were powered by two 12-cylinder Vickers  diesel engines, each driving one propeller shaft. When submerged each propeller was driven by a  electric motor. They could reach  on the surface and  underwater.

The boats were armed with four 21-inch torpedo tubes in the bow and two 18-inch (45 cm) in broadside mounts. They carried four reload torpedoes for the 21-inch tubes for a grand total of ten torpedoes of all sizes. They were also armed with a  deck gun.

Construction and career

HMS L15 was built by Fairfield Shipbuilding and Engineering Company, Govan, Clyde. She was laid down on 16 November 1916 and was commissioned on 16 January 1918. She sailed with the Submarine Depot Ship HMS Ambrose (1903) to Hong Kong in 1919 as part of the 4th Submarine Flotilla, arriving there in January 1920. The boat was sold to John Cashmore Ltd in February 1932 for scrapping at Newport.

Notes

References
 
 
 
 

 

British L-class submarines
Ships built in Govan
1918 ships
World War I submarines of the United Kingdom
Royal Navy ship names